= Associated reproductive pattern =

An associated reproductive pattern is a seasonal change in reproduction which is highly correlated with a change in gonad and associated hormone.

== Notable Model Organisms ==
1. Parthenogenic Whiptail Lizards
